Three Rivers State Park is a Florida State Park located north of Sneads, on the shores of Lake Seminole near the Georgia border, in northwestern Florida. It is named for the main rivers associated with Lake Seminole: the Chattahoochee and the Flint (which flow into it from Georgia), and the Apalachicola (whose source is the lake itself.) The address is 7908 Three Rivers Park Road.

Recreational Activities
The park has such amenities as boating, canoeing, fishing, hiking, kayaking, picnicking and full camping facilities.

External links
 Three Rivers State Park at Florida State Parks

Parks in Jackson County, Florida
State parks of Florida
Rivers of Florida
Bodies of water of Jackson County, Florida
1955 establishments in Florida
Protected areas established in 1955